Paprika is a 1959 West German comedy film directed by  and starring Willy Hagara, Violetta Ferrari and Waltraut Haas. It was adapted from the play, "Der Sprung in die Ehe," written 
Max Reimann and Otto Schwartz.

Cast
 Willy Hagara as Bert
 Violetta Ferrari as Ilona
 Waltraut Haas as Anita
 Georg Thomalla as Paul
 Gregor von Rezzori as Tokasz, Ilonas Vater
 Peter Frankenfeld as Direktor
 Eddi Arent
 Margarete Haagen as Ludmilla
 Viktor Afritsch
 Elke Arendt as Rosie
 Michl Lang as Josef
 Iska Geri as Dora
 Uschi Siebert as Anni
 Carsta Löck as Erna
 Hans Stadtmüller
 Franz Baur
 Willy Schultes
 Willem Holsboer
 Tielman Brothers as Musical Quartett

See also
 Paprika (1932)

References

Bibliography
 Goble, Alan. The Complete Index to Literary Sources in Film. Walter de Gruyter, 1999.

External links 
 

1959 films
1959 comedy films
German comedy films
West German films
1950s German-language films
Films directed by Kurt Wilhelm
German films based on plays
Remakes of German films
1950s German films